The state border–Botovo–Koprivnica–Dugo Selo railway, officially designated the M201 railway, is a  railway line in Croatia that connects the Croatian city of Dugo Selo, situated east of national capital Zagreb, with the Hungarian rail network. It is part of the Pan-European Corridor V, branch b, which runs from Rijeka to Budapest. The line is fully electrified and mostly single-tracked. It is used for freight and passenger (international, regional/commuter) traffic.

In Dugo Selo, the southern terminus of the railway, the line connects to the M102 line to Zagreb and the M103 to Novska and Belgrade. Further junctions exist in Križevci and Koprivnica, to railways L204 and R202 respectively.

Reconstruction of the existing and construction of the second track on the Dugo Selo - Križevci section (2016 - 2024) 
Part of the corridor between Dugo Selo and Križevci is currently under major reconstruction.

The project includes:

construction of the second track and reconstruction of the existing one on the entire railway line section in the length of 36.4 km (conversion of a single-track railway into a double-track).

major reconstruction of the existing stations of Dugo Selo, Vrbovec and Križevci and construction of the new station in Gradec. Reconstruction included: construction of new 55-cm high platforms, underpasses, canopies, parking lots, installation of a new outdoor lighting system and a system of video surveillance and visual and audio notification for passengers

reconstruction of horizontal curves on the 9.4 km existing track

construction of 6 new bridges (including 2 road bridges) and the reconstruction of the existing 7, reconstruction / construction of 36 railway culverts

construction of 12 grade-separated crossings with roads at two levels (11 overpasses and 1 underpass) and 6 pedestrian underpasses at stations and stops with the elimination of 17 level crossings and 2 pedestrian crossings

complete overhaul of the electrification system and modernization of interlocking, signalling, and telecommunication devices with the installation of Level 1: ETCS

construction of noise barriers
construction of closed drainage system 
construction of 39 km of service and access roads

construction of access parking lots, replacement of the old passenger platforms with new, 55-cm high ones, reconstruction of the outdoor lighting system, installation of canopies and a system of video surveillance and visual and audio notification for passengers at stop locations 

After the reconstruction will be completed, maximum operating speed for trains along the route will be 160 km/h.

Reconstruction of the existing and construction of the second track on the Križevci – Koprivnica – state border with Hungary section (2020 – 2024) 
Part of the corridor between Križevci and the state border with Hungary is currently under major reconstruction.

The project includes:

reconstruction of the existing track and the construction of a second track along the entire 42,6 km rail section (conversion of a single-track railway into a double-track). 

construction of a new Drnje – Novo Drnje – Botovo connecting track

conversion of the Mučna Reka station into a stop

construction of new 55-cm high passenger platforms, underpasses, canopies, parking lots, installation of a new outdoor lighting system and a system of video surveillance and visual and audio notification for passengers at all stations along the route (Lepavina, Koprivnica, Novo Drnje)

dismantling of the existing Drnje and Botovo stations and construction of new Lepavina and Novo Drnje station buildings

construction of a new stop in Peteranec

construction of access parking lots, replacement of the old passenger platforms with new, 55-cm high ones, reconstruction of the outdoor lighting system, installation of canopies and a system of video surveillance and visual and audio notification for passengers at stop locations

replacement of all level crossings with grade separated level crossings

construction of noise barriers
construction of a closed drainage system

complete overhaul of the electrification system, modernization of control-command, telecommunications and signalling subsystems, installation of level 1 ETCS, protection and relocation of utilities and other infrastructure

construction of 7 bridges, 1 gallery and 3 viaducts (as a part of horizontal curves reconstruction), one of which is a crossing for wild animals

construction of 8 road overpasses and 3 road underpasses

After the reconstruction will be completed, maximum operating speed for trains along the route will be 160 km/h.

See also 
List of railways in Croatia

Maps

References

External links

Railway lines in Croatia
International railway lines
Economy of Koprivnica